Gyula Hornyánszky (Pest, 22 September 1869 - Budapest, 31 January 1933), was a Hungarian classical scholar and member of the Hungarian Academy of Sciences.

Selected publications
Pindaros. Tanulmány. Budapest, 1891.
Temetési versenyküzdelmek az ősgörögöknél. Budapest, Hornyánszky Viktor, 1900.
Történetírás és philosophia. Budapest, Hornyánszky Viktor, 1904.
A homerosi beszédek tömeglélektani vonatkozásukban. Budapest, A.M. Tud. Akad., 1915.
Die Idee der öffentlichen Meinung bei den Griechen. Szeged, 1922.

References

External links

 :hu:Hornyánszky Gyula

1869 births
1933 deaths
Academic staff of the University of Szeged
Members of the Hungarian Academy of Sciences
Hungarian classical scholars
19th-century Hungarian writers
19th-century Hungarian male writers
20th-century Hungarian writers
20th-century Hungarian male writers